Sexual Life is a 2004 American comedy-drama film written and directed by Ken Kwapis, who would go on to chronicle modern romantic life in the better-known He's Just Not That Into You in 2009. Produced by Ken Aguado and distributed by Showtime Independent Films. Cast members include Azura Skye, Carla Gallo, Anne Heche, Elizabeth Banks, Tom Everett Scott and Kerry Washington.

It is adapted from Arthur Schnitzler's 1897 play La Ronde.

Premise
Like La Ronde, Sexual Life has an unconventional narrative structure, identified by Charles Ramírez Berg as the "daisy chain plot", in which there is not a single protagonist, but instead one central character links to another.

Cast 
 Eion Bailey as David
 Elizabeth Banks  as Sarah
 Carla Gallo as Terri
 Dulé Hill as Jerry
 James LeGros as Josh
 Tom Everett Scott as Todd
 Azura Skye  as Lorna
 Kerry Washington  as Rosalie
 Anne Heche as Gwen
 Kevin Corrigan as Phil
 Shirley Knight as Joanne
 Steven Weber as David Wharton

Reception and awards
Variety found its portrayal of the subject matter to be limited, writing, "this semi-comedy of manners and hormones suffers from being much too neat and tidy, aesthetically and dramatically sweeping aside a lot of the messiness that comes with sex."

The film won the Copper Wing Award for best director at Phoenix Film Festival.

References

External links

2004 films
2004 comedy-drama films
2004 independent films
American comedy-drama films
American films based on plays
American independent films
Films scored by Cliff Eidelman
Films directed by Ken Kwapis
2000s English-language films
2000s American films